Clay Springs is a census-designated place (CDP) in Navajo County, Arizona, United States. Clay Springs has a post office with ZIP code 85923.

Demographics

As of the census of 2010, there were 401 people, 124 households, and 91 families residing in the CDP.

Climate
According to the Köppen Climate Classification system, Clay Springs has a cool-summer Mediterranean climate, abbreviated Csb on climate maps. Winters are very cold at night and cool to cold during the day, with on average 3.7 nights below  and 171.1 nights below . April to June warms up and is generally the driest part of the year before monsoon storms hit between July and mid-September. Typically 17 days will hit , but minima are generally not above  due to the altitude.

Transportation
Mountain Valley Shuttle stops in Clay Springs on its Phoenix-Show Low route.

References

Populated places of the Mogollon Rim
Unincorporated communities in Navajo County, Arizona
Unincorporated communities in Arizona
Census-designated places in Navajo County, Arizona